Richard Traffles DCL (15 August 1648, in Winchester – 30 June 1703, in Oxford) was an English educator in the first decade of the 18th Century.

Traffles graduated BCL from New College, Oxford in 1673. He was warden of his college from 1701 until his death.

References

1648 births
People from Winchester
1703 deaths
Wardens of New College, Oxford
18th-century scholars